Top Chef: Chicago is the fourth season of the American reality television series Top Chef. It was first filmed in Chicago, Illinois before concluding in San Juan, Puerto Rico. The season premiered on Bravo on March 12, 2008, and ended on June 18, 2008. In the season finale, Stephanie Izard was declared the winner over runners-up Richard Blais and Lisa Fernandes. Izard was also voted Fan Favorite.

Contestants
Sixteen chefs were selected to compete in Top Chef: Chicago.

Richard Blais, Antonia Lofaso, Spike Mendelsohn, and Dale Talde returned to compete in Top Chef: All-Stars. Blais, Lofaso, Talde and Stephanie Izard later competed in Top Chef Duels. Lisa Fernandes returned for Top Chef: All-Stars L.A.

Contestant progress

: The chef(s) did not receive immunity for winning the Quickfire Challenge.
: Episode 1's Quickfire Challenge resulted in the 16 contestants being split into two groups of 8: the winners and losers. No immunity was given to the winners. This was done for the purpose of the head-to-head cook-off in the Elimination Challenge.
: Richard was originally awarded the win by the judges. Although he gave the win to Stephanie, and she shared the prize, he is considered the sole winner of the challenge, according to the Bravo website.
 (WINNER) The chef won the season and was crowned "Top Chef".
 (RUNNER-UP) The chef was a runner-up for the season.
 (WIN) The chef won the Elimination Challenge.
 (HIGH) The chef was selected as one of the top entries in the Elimination Challenge but did not win.
 (IN) The chef was not selected as one of the top or bottom entries in the Elimination Challenge and was safe.
 (LOW) The chef was selected as one of the bottom entries in the Elimination Challenge but was not eliminated.
 (OUT) The chef lost the Elimination Challenge.

Episodes

References
Notes

Footnotes

External links
 Official website

Top Chef
2008 American television seasons
Television shows set in Chicago
Television shows filmed in Illinois
Television shows filmed in Puerto Rico